Isabela Island is the largest island of the Galápagos with an area of  and length of , almost four times larger than Santa Cruz, the second largest of the archipelago. Isabela Island is larger than every other island in the Galápagos combined. It was named after Queen Isabella I of Castile. The island straddles the equator. This island was originally named Albemarle Island for the Duke of Albemarle by Ambrose Cowley, one of the first Europeans to set foot on the islands, in 1684.

Geology

One of the youngest islands, Isabela is located on the western edge of the archipelago near the Galápagos hotspot.  At approximately 1 million years old, the seahorse-shaped island was formed by the merger of six shield volcanoes; Alcedo, Cerro Azul, Darwin, Ecuador, Sierra Negra, and Wolf.  All of these volcanoes except Ecuador are still active, making it one of the most volcanically active places on earth. Two of the volcanoes, Volcan Ecuador and Volcan Wolf (the island's highest point with an elevation of ), lie directly on the equator.  The island is primarily noted for its geology, providing excellent examples of a geologic occurrence that created the Galápagos Islands including uplifts at Urbina Bay and the Bolivar Channel, tuff cones at Tagus Cove, and Pulmace on Alcedo and Sierra Negra, one of the most active volcanoes in the world.

Wildlife

Isabela is also interesting for its flora and fauna. The young island does not follow the vegetation zones of the other islands. The relatively new lava fields and surrounding soils have not developed the sufficient nutrients required to support the varied life zones found on other islands.  Another obvious difference occurs on Volcan Wolf and Cerro Azul; these volcanoes loft above the cloud cover and are arid on top.

Isabela's rich bird, animal and marine life is beyond compare. Isabela is home to more wild tortoises than all the other islands. Isabela's large size and notable topography created barriers for the slow-moving tortoises; apparently the creatures were unable to cross lava flows and other obstacles, causing several different sub-species of tortoise to develop. Today, tortoises roam free in the calderas of Alcedo, Wolf, Cerro Azul, Darwin, and Sierra Negra.

Introduced goats multiplied to over 100,000, but were eradicated by the Galápagos National Park Service and the Charles Darwin Foundation in 2006-2007. Since then, the vegetation has recovered greatly.

Other noted species include penguins, cormorants, marine iguanas, boobies, pelicans, Sally Lightfoot crabs, Galápagos land iguanas, Darwin's finches, Galápagos hawks, Galápagos doves, and very interesting lowland vegetation. The west coast of Isabela in the Bolivar Channel is the best place in Galápagos for viewing whales and dolphin.

History

Human occupation
The settlements of Puerto Villamil and Santo Tomás were founded in 1893. By 1905, the population of the island was 200. Exports at the time were sulfur mined from fumaroles and lime made from coral. Tortoises were used for meat and oil. The third-largest human settlement of the archipelago, Puerto Villamil, is located at the south-eastern tip of the island.

Other points of interest
Other popular attractions include El Muro de las Lágrimas, a wall built by prisoners when the island was a penal colony, and the Flamingo Lagoon, named for the flamingos found there. Both are in the south of the island.

See also
Ecuador
List of volcanoes in Ecuador
South America, the nearest continent
Volcanoes of the Galápagos Islands

References

External links

 Galapagos Conservancy

Islands of the Galápagos Islands
Volcanoes of the Galápagos Islands
Hotspot volcanoes
Active volcanoes